The wildlife of South Asia encompasses that of India, Pakistan, Nepal, Bhutan, Bangladesh, Sri Lanka, Afghanistan and the Maldives.

Wildlife of India
Wildlife of Pakistan
Wildlife of Nepal
Wildlife of Bhutan
Wildlife of Bangladesh
Wildlife of Sri Lanka
Wildlife of Maldives
Wildlife of Afghanistan
Wildlife conservation
Fauna of India
Flora of India
List of fish in India
Ecoregions of India
The study of natural history in India
Asiatic Lion Reintroduction Project
List of Zoos in India
Central Zoo Authority of India (CZA)
Zoo Outreach Organisation (ZOO), India is an NGO
Wildlife Institute of India (WII)
Indian Institute of Forest Management (IIFM)
Zoological Survey of India (ZSI)
India Nature Watch (INW) spreading the love of nature and wildlife in India through photography
Geological Survey of India (GSI) also maintains 2 fossil parks currently.
Fossil Parks of India
Protected areas of India
List of protected areas in India
National parks of India
Biosphere reserves of India
Conservation areas of India
Wildlife sanctuaries of India
Reserved forests and protected forests of India
Conservation reserves and community reserves of India
Communal forests of India, including
Sacred groves of India
Social forestry in India
Private protected areas of India
Environmental policy of India
Indian Forest Act, 1927
Wildlife Protection Act of 1972
Project Tiger
Project Elephant
Ministry of Environment and Forests (India)